Albert P. Bruno (March 28, 1927 – October 5, 2014) was an American gridiron football player, administrator, and coach who served as the head coach of the Hamilton Tiger-Cats from 1983 to 1990.

Early life
He was born in 1927 in West Chester, Pennsylvania. A graduate of West Chester High School and The Perkiomen School, Bruno attended the University of Kentucky from 1948 to 1951. He played end on Kentucky Wildcats football team, played forward for the Wildcats basketball team, and was a member of the track team.

In his senior season, Bruno caught 38 passes for 589 yards and 10 touchdowns and was named third-team All America by both AP and UPI. His single-season school record for receiving yards stood until 1964 and his single-season record for touchdown receptions held until 1998.

Bruno played nine games during the Wildcats 1948–49 championship winning basketball season, averaging 2.2 points per game.

Bruno is one of only three Wildcats to have played for Hall of Fame coaches Bear Bryant in football and Adolph Rupp in basketball.

Playing career
Bruno was drafted by the Philadelphia Eagles in the third round of the 1951 NFL Draft, but chose to play for the Toronto Argonauts instead. He played two seasons for the Argonauts, one game for the Ottawa Rough Riders, two seasons with the Winnipeg Blue Bombers, and three seasons with the London Lords before a serious knee injury ended his playing career.

Coaching career
Bruno's coaching career began in 1958 a player-coach for the London Lords. After his playing career ended, he returned to Pennsylvania to teach and coach football at his alma mater West Chester High School.

In 1966, he returned to Canada as an assistant coach with the Ottawa Rough Riders. He left the Riders in 1968 and joined the coaching staff of the Hamilton Tiger-Cats. When head coach Joe Restic left to become head coach at Harvard, Bruno went with him to be the offensive coordinator.

After 11 seasons as the Crimson's offensive coordinator, Bruno returned to Hamilton as Director of Player Personnel. In 1983, Bruno was named head coach after the firing of Bud Riley. The Tiger-Cats finished the season 2–1–1 and Bruno was given the coaching job permanently. Under Bruno's guidance, the Tiger-Cats appeared in the Grey Cup four times, winning one (1986). He was placed on an indefinite leave of absence after suffering a mild heart attack during the 1987 season. Defensive Coordinator Ted Schmitz served as interim head coach for six games before Bruno returned. Bruno was fired 12 games into the 1990 season. At the time of his firing the Tiger-Cats had a 4–8 record and were on a five-game losing streak.

After scouting for the BC Lions and the Buffalo Bills, Bruno was named the head coach of the New Mexico Rattlesnakes of the new Professional Spring Football League. The PSFL folded before play began.

Bruno's final coaching job was at McMaster University, where he served as head coach from 1994 to 1996. After his football career, Bruno and his wife, Marie, retired to Port Charlotte, Florida.

Death
In October 2014, Bruno was admitted into a Port Charlotte hospital with kidney problems, after having lost one kidney several years prior.  He died of heart failure at the hospital on October 5, 2014.

Head coaching record

CFL

References

1927 births
2014 deaths
American football ends
American men's basketball players
American players of Canadian football
Forwards (basketball)
Buffalo Bills scouts
Canadian Football League executives
Hamilton Tiger-Cats coaches
Harvard Crimson football coaches
Kentucky Wildcats football players
Kentucky Wildcats men's basketball players
Ontario Rugby Football Union players
Toronto Argonauts coaches
College men's track and field athletes in the United States
High school football coaches in Pennsylvania
People from West Chester, Pennsylvania
People from Punta Gorda, Florida
Sportspeople from Chester County, Pennsylvania
Players of American football from Pennsylvania
Basketball players from Pennsylvania